Frohes Fest (German for "Merry Celebration" in relation to a Christmas celebration) is the second studio album released by the Neue Deutsche Härte band Unheilig. It was released in 2002 in two versions, a standard one-disc edition and a limited two-disc edition (which includes the Tannenbaum EP as a bonus disc).

The album has several traditional German Christmas songs, including the popular "O Tannenbaum" and "Stille Nacht, heilige Nacht".

Track listing

Frohes Fest

Tannenbaum EP

2002 Christmas albums
Christmas albums by German artists
2002 EPs
Unheilig albums
German-language albums